The Well of Dina Nath was intended to be a water well in the Wazir Khan Chowk in Lahore, Pakistan. The well's construction by in the 19th century by a Sikh nobleman sparked controversy, given its location in the immediate vicinity of the Wazir Khan Mosque.

History
The well was commissioned by Raja Dina Nath in the mid 19th century under the reign of Ranjit Singh. The well was not built as an open well, but is instead enclosed within a walled structure.

Legend
It is said that Nath wished to build his well near the site of a well dug Sufi saint Said Soaf despite strong objections from local Muslim leaders who viewed construction of a second well to be antagonistic to the saint's memory. Disregarding their warnings and objections, Dina Nath ordered construction to begin on the site. After 200 metres of digging, labourers could not tap a water source, and refused to dig any further, much to the embarrassment of Dina Nath. The well has remained dry ever since, and remains a local monument.

Restoration
The well fell into disrepair, and was eventually surrounded by illegally constructed shops which had encroached upon the Wazir Khan Chowk. In 2012, the Aga Khan Trust for Culture and the Government of Punjab launched restoration efforts which have since removed the illegal shops, restoring public access to the well.

References

Architecture of Lahore
Buildings and structures in Lahore
Walled City of Lahore
Sikh architecture
Water wells